The 2013–14 Melbourne Victory FC W-League season was the club's sixth participation in the W-League, since the league's formation in 2008.

Season overview

Players

Squad information

Transfers in

Transfers out

Squad statistics

Disciplinary record

Goal scorers

Competitions

Overall

W-League

Matches

League table

Results summary

Results by round

W-League Finals series

Awards
 Female Footballer of the Year - Lisa De Vanna
 Female U20 Footballer of the Year - Stephanie Catley
 Player of the Week (Round 3) - Jessica Fishlock
 Player of the Week (Round 8) - Katie Hoyle

References

External links
 Official website

Melbourne Victory FC (A-League Women) seasons
Melbourne